Leonard Boyd Mitchell (born October 12, 1958) is a former American college and professional football player who was a defensive end in the National Football League (NFL) for seven seasons during the 1980s.  He played college football for the University of Houston, and earned All-American honors.  Mitchell was selected in the first round of the 1981 NFL Draft, and played professionally for the Philadelphia Eagles and Atlanta Falcons of the NFL.

1958 births
Living people
All-American college football players
American football offensive tackles
American football defensive ends
Atlanta Falcons players
Houston Cougars football players
Players of American football from Houston
Philadelphia Eagles players